National Astronaut Day is an American commemorative day held on May 5 since 2017. It commemorates the first United States human spaceflight, on May 5, 1961, piloted by astronaut Alan Shepard.

See Also
International Day of Human Space Flight
Astronauts Day
Cosmonautics Day
Yuri's Night

References

Anniversaries
Space advocacy
May observances
Observances in the United States
Science commemorations
Project Mercury
Alan Shepard